Lorenzo Galassi (born 31 May 1991) is an Italian footballer who currently is on a free agent.

Biography
Born in Busto Arsizio, Lombardy, Galassi started his career at Emilia club Parma.

Novara
In May 2011 Galassi joined fellow Serie A club Novara Calcio on free transfer. On 31 July 2011 Galassi and Daniele Francesca were signed by Lega Pro Prima Divisione club A.C. Pavia in co-ownership deal and temporary deal respectively. On 22 June 2012 Galassi returned to Piedmont. On 27 August 2012 Galassi left for Mantova F.C. On 29 August 2013 Galassi was signed by Viareggio along with Andrea Peverelli.

On 31 January 2015 he was signed by Portuguese club Olhanense in another temporary deal. Galassi made 2 appearances only in 2014–15 Lega Pro.

International career
Born in Italy, Galassi is of Dominican descent. Galassi was an active member of Italy youth national teams. He played 13 times in 2006–07 season, including international Val-de-Marne tournament. He played twice for U17 team in 2008 UEFA European Under-17 Football Championship elite qualification, sharing the starting defender role with Davide Faraoni. He also played 4 friendlies in 2007–08, excluding 2008 Minsk under-17 International Tournament, which no line-ups were documented. He played his first and last U18 cap on 14 January 2009, against Denmark, as the substitute of Max Taddei. He participated in a training camp for U18 team in November 2008.

References

External links
 AIC profile (data by football.it) 
 

1991 births
Living people
People from Busto Arsizio
Italian people of Dominican Republic descent
Sportspeople of Dominican Republic descent
Footballers from Lombardy
Italian footballers
Association football midfielders
Parma Calcio 1913 players
Novara F.C. players
F.C. Pavia players
Mantova 1911 players
F.C. Esperia Viareggio players
Serie C players
Italy youth international footballers
Sportspeople from the Province of Varese